This is a list of the squads picked for the 2012 ICC Women's World Twenty20 tournament.

Australia
 Jodie Fields (captain)
 Alex Blackwell 
 Jess Cameron
 Nicola Carey
 Lauren Ebsary
 Rachael Haynes
 Alyssa Healy (wk)
 Julie Hunter
 Jess Jonassen
 Meg Lanning
 Erin Osborne
 Ellyse Perry
 Leah Poulton
 Lisa Sthalekar
 Sarah Coyte

England
 Charlotte Edwards (captain)
 Tammy Beaumont (wk)
 Arran Brindle
 Katherine Brunt
 Holly Colvin
 Lydia Greenway
 Jenny Gunn
 Danielle Hazell
 Amy Jones
 Heather Knight
 Laura Marsh
 Anya Shrubsole
 Sarah Taylor
 Danielle Wyatt
 Susie Rowe (withdrawn)

India
 Mithali Raj (captain)
 Harmanpreet Kaur
 Ekta Bisht
 Archana Das
 Jhulan Goswami
 Reema Malhotra
 Mona Meshram
 Sulakshana Naik (wk)
 Nagarajan Niranjana
 Rasanara Parwin
 Anuja Patil
 Poonam Raut
 Amita Sharma
 Shubhlakshmi Sharma
 Gouher Sultana (withdrawn)

New Zealand
 Suzie Bates (captain)
 Erin Bermingham
 Kate Broadmore
 Nicola Browne
 Sophie Devine
 Lucy Doolan
 Sara McGlashan
 Frances Mackay
 Katey Martin (wk)
 Morna Nielsen
 Katie Perkins
 Liz Perry
 Sian Ruck
 Amy Satterthwaite

Pakistan
 Sana Mir (captain)
 Nain Abidi
 Asmavia Iqbal
 Batool Fatima (wk)
 Bismah Maroof
 Elizebath Khan
 Javeria Khan
 Javeria Rauf
 Marina Iqbal
 Nahida Khan
 Nida Dar
 Qanita Jalil
 Sadia Yousuf
 Sumaiya Siddiqi
 Masooma Junaid (withdrawn)

South Africa
 Mignon du Preez (captain)
 Trisha Chetty (wk)
 Susan Benade
 Dinesha Devnarain
 Shandre Fritz
 Alison Hodgkinson
 Shabnim Ismail
 Marizanne Kapp
 Ayabonga Khaka
 Marcia Letsoalo
 Sunette Loubser
 Suné Luus
 Yolandi van der Westhuizen
 Dane van Niekerk

Sri Lanka
 Shashikala Siriwardene (captain)
 Sandamali Dolawatte
 Inoka Galagedara
 Chamari Atapattu
 Eshani Lokusuriyage
 Yasoda Mendis
 Udeshika Prabodhani
 Inoka Ranaweera
 Deepika Rasangika
 Maduri Samuddika
 Chamani Seneviratna
 Dilani Manodara (wk)
 Prasadani Weerakkody
 Sripali Weerakkody
 Nilakshi de Silva (withdrawn)

West Indies
 Merissa Aguilleira (captain, wk)
 Stafanie Taylor
 Shemaine Campbelle
 Britney Cooper
 Shanel Daley
 Deandra Dottin
 Stacy-Ann King
 Kycia Knight
 Anisa Mohammed
 Subrina Munroe
 Juliana Nero
 Shaquana Quintyne
 Shakera Selman
 Tremayne Smartt

See also
 2012 ICC World Twenty20 squads

References

External links
 2012 ICC Women's World Twenty20 squads on ESPN CricInfo

ICC Women's World Twenty20 squads
2012 ICC Women's World Twenty20